The Koua River is a river in New Caledonia. It has a catchment area of 195 square kilometres.

See also
List of rivers of New Caledonia

References

Rivers of New Caledonia